The 2021–22 Hong Kong First Division League was the 8th season of Hong Kong First Division since it became the second-tier football league in Hong Kong in 2014–15. The season began on 19 September 2021 and ended on 26 December 2021.

Format
Promotion and relegation was suspended during the 2020–21 season and the season was shortened to a single round-robin due to the COVID-19 pandemic in Hong Kong. As a result, all 14 teams from the previous season were permitted to remain during the 2021–22 season.

League table

References

Hong Kong First Division League seasons
2021–22 in Hong Kong football
Hong Kong
Association football events curtailed and voided due to the COVID-19 pandemic